Alan Edgar "Buddy" Owens (born May 23, 1948 in Mesa, Arizona), known professionally as Buddy Alan, is an American country music artist. The son of Buck Owens and Bonnie Owens and stepson of Merle Haggard, Alan recorded four albums for Capitol Records in the 1970s. He also charted eight singles in the Top 40 on the Billboard country charts, including his No. 7 debut single "Let the World Keep On A-Turnin'", a duet with Buck.

Biography
Alan Edgar Owens was born May 22, 1948 in Mesa, Arizona, to country music artist Buck Owens and his then-wife, Bonnie Owens. He founded a rock band called the Chosen Few at age 14 before turning his interests to country music. When Bonnie Owens divorced Buck and married Merle Haggard, Alan moved to Arizona with his mother and new stepfather.

Crediting himself as Buddy Alan, he charted for the first time in 1968 with "Let the World Keep On A-Turnin'", a duet with Buck Owens that reached Top Ten on the country charts. This was followed by "When I Turn Twenty-One", which Haggard co-wrote. Alan toured with his father (who also worked as his promoter) and released an album entitled Wild, Free and Twenty One, in addition to making appearances on Hee Haw. Later on, he charted again in the Top 20 with "Cowboy Convention", a duet with Owens' guitarist Don Rich, and earned a Most Promising Male Artist award from the Academy of Country Music. He continued to chart into the 1970s, but retired from the music business in 1978 to attend college. After that, he became a music director at local radio stations, and was voted four times as Billboard Music Director of the Year.

Discography

Albums

Singles

References

1948 births
Living people
Musicians from Mesa, Arizona
American country singer-songwriters
Capitol Records artists
Country musicians from Arizona
Singer-songwriters from Arizona